Filip Zaborowski (born 25 July 1994) is a Polish swimmer. He competed in the men's 400 metre freestyle event at the 2016 Summer Olympics.

References

External links
 

1994 births
Living people
Olympic swimmers of Poland
Swimmers at the 2016 Summer Olympics
Sportspeople from Gdynia
Polish male freestyle swimmers
Universiade medalists in swimming
Universiade bronze medalists for Poland
Medalists at the 2019 Summer Universiade
21st-century Polish people